The Kingsbury House is a historic house at 137 Suffolk Street in the Chestnut Hill section of Newton, Massachusetts.  The oldest part of this -story timber frame may have been built as early as 1686; its exterior styling suggests a construction date in the early 18th century, but the earlier structure may have been incorporated in new construction at that time.  The house is one a few First Period houses in Newton, and was associated for many years in the 19th century with the Kingsbury family, who were major landowners in the Chestnut Hill area.

The house was listed on the National Register of Historic Places in 1986, and included in an expansion of the Old Chestnut Hill Historic District in 1990.

See also
 List of the oldest buildings in Massachusetts
 National Register of Historic Places listings in Newton, Massachusetts

References

Houses on the National Register of Historic Places in Newton, Massachusetts
Georgian architecture in Massachusetts
Houses completed in 1686
Historic district contributing properties in Massachusetts
National Register of Historic Places in Newton, Massachusetts
1686 establishments in Massachusetts